The Harmonie Club is an exclusive private social club in New York City, U.S., founded in 1852.

Harmonie Club may also refer to:

Harmonie Club (Detroit, Michigan), a historic building in downtown Detroit, Michigan, U.S.
Harmony Society, Batavia (Dutch: Societeit de Harmonie), a former elite social club in Batavia, Dutch East Indies